Sandra Michelle Scolnik (born 1968) is an American artist. Her work is included in the collections of the Whitney Museum of American Art and the San Francisco Museum of Modern Art.

Education
Scolnik received her MFA from SUNY Albany.

References

1968 births
20th-century American artists
20th-century American women artists
21st-century American artists
21st-century American women artists
Living people